De Winton is a hamlet in southern Alberta, Canada within the Foothills County.  It is located just south of the City of Calgary and west of Highway 2A (MacLeod Trail).

De Winton is located within Census Division No. 6.

A variant name is Dewinton. The village has the name of Francis de Winton, a British army officer.

History 
During the Second World War, a Royal Air Force pilot training school was located at the Royal Canadian Air Force air station at De Winton (today's De Winton/South Calgary Airport). Temporary buildings were erected to house operations and accommodate service personnel.

Demographics 
The population of De Winton according to the 2003 municipal census conducted by Foothills County is 98.

See also 
List of communities in Alberta
List of hamlets in Alberta

References

Foothills County
Hamlets in Alberta